The Halliburton Townhouses are a pair of virtually identical residential buildings at 1601 and 1605 Center Street in Little Rock, Arkansas.  They are two story wood frame Classical Revival structures, dominated by oversides two-story gabled porticos supported by Corinthian columns.  They were built in 1905 or 1906 in what was then one of the most fashionable neighborhoods of the city.  They were probably built by Thomas Halliburton, a prominent local landowner who once ran for mayor.

The houses were listed on the National Register of Historic Places in 1976.

See also
National Register of Historic Places listings in Little Rock, Arkansas

References

Houses on the National Register of Historic Places in Arkansas
Neoclassical architecture in Arkansas
Houses completed in 1905
Houses in Little Rock, Arkansas
National Register of Historic Places in Little Rock, Arkansas
Historic district contributing properties in Arkansas
1905 establishments in Arkansas